Charles Mann may refer to:

 Charles Mann (advocate-general) (1799–1860), British born administrator in South Australia (father of Charles Mann born 1838)
 Charles Mann (American football) (born 1961), American football player
 Charles Mann (Australian politician) (1838–1889), Attorney-General and Treasurer in South Australia
 Charles Mann (songwriter) (1949–1991), AKA "Charles M. Mann", American songwriter, soul singer and musician of the 1970s
 Charles Mann (singer) (born 1944), American singer from Louisiana, performer of the musical genre swamp pop
 Charles A. Mann (1803–1860), New York politician
 Charles C. Mann (born 1955), author and journalist
 Charlie Mann (born c. 1959), Scottish sports broadcaster
 , a United States Navy tug and patrol vessel in commission from 1917 to 1919

Mann, Charles